This is a list of the Mayors and Lord Mayors of the City of Hobart local government area, Hobart, Tasmania, Australia.

Mayors (1853–1934)

Lord Mayors (since 1935)
The title of 'Lord Mayor' was conferred on the position of Mayor during the 1934 – 1935 council.

References

 Hobart City Council – About Council

Hobart

Mayors